The Daily Citizen was a short-lived early 20th century British newspaper from October 1912 to June 1915. It was an official organ of the nascent Labour Party and published in London with a simultaneous edition in Manchester.  Tom Webster was brought from Birmingham to be the paper's political cartoonist, and a young Neville Cardus was briefly a music critic for the paper in 1913.

References

Defunct newspapers published in the United Kingdom
1910s in the United Kingdom
History of the Labour Party (UK)